Yuri Viktorovich Ozerov (July 5, 1928 – February 25, 2004) was a Russian basketball player who competed for the Soviet Union in the 1952 Summer Olympics and in the 1956 Summer Olympics. He trained at Dynamo in Moscow.

He was a member of the Soviet team which won the silver medal. He played all eight matches. Four years later he won his second silver medal as part of the Soviet team.

Footnotes

External links
databaseolympics profile
sport-necropol profile 

1928 births
2004 deaths
Russian men's basketball players
Soviet men's basketball players
1959 FIBA World Championship players
Olympic basketball players of the Soviet Union
Basketball players at the 1952 Summer Olympics
Basketball players at the 1956 Summer Olympics
Olympic silver medalists for the Soviet Union
BC Dynamo Moscow players
FIBA EuroBasket-winning players
Olympic medalists in basketball
Medalists at the 1956 Summer Olympics
Medalists at the 1952 Summer Olympics